El Último Tour Del Mundo (Spanish for "The Final Tour of the World", stylized in all caps) is the third studio album by Puerto Rican rapper and singer Bad Bunny. It was released on November 27, 2020, by Rimas Entertainment, only nine months after the release of his previous record YHLQMDLG, which achieved both commercial success and critical acclaim. Comprising sixteen tracks, it is primarily a Latin trap and reggaeton album infused with a variety of rock music styles, and features guest appearances from Jhay Cortez, Rosalía, Abra, and Trío Vegabajeño. The album's title refers to how Bad Bunny imagined what his last concert tour would look like, as he imagined his final tour in the year 2032. The album was written and recorded during the COVID-19 quarantine and is a departure from Bad Bunny's aggressive reggaetón sound.

It became the first all-Spanish-language album to reach number one on the US Billboard 200. El Ultimo Tour Del Mundo was the best-selling Latin album in the United States of 2021 and was the most consumed and streamed album in Mexico, Colombia, Chile, and Argentina that year. The album won Best Urban Music Album at the 22nd Annual Latin Grammy Awards and Best Música Urbana Album at the 64th Grammy Awards. To promote the album, he had embarked on a concert tour with the same name.

Background and singles 
Bad Bunny first teased his third studio album on February 29, 2020, when he sang on the song "<3": "this album is so hot, I did it for you all, and in nine months I'll come back and release another one; to retire pleasingly like Miguel Cotto". On October 30, the lead single of the album, "Dakiti", featuring Puerto Rican singer and close friend Jhay Cortez was released, reaching number one on the Billboard Global 200 chart. The album's title was teased in the video for "Dakiti", in which a big truck drives by with a message that displays the title. On November 24, 2020, he again hinted at a new album, tweeting the word "Temazo", which translates to "hit". He posted a similar post on Twitter before YHLQMDLG was released. The day after, he announced the release date of the album, its title, and tracklist. The album was released along with a video for the single "Yo Visto Así", featuring cameos from, among others, Ricky Martin and Sofía Vergara. A video for the track "Hoy Cobré" was released on December 11. A video for another track, "Booker T", was released on January 2, 2021, starring WWE wrestler Booker T. A video for "Te deseo lo mejor" was made in collaboration with The Simpsons.

Composition and recording 
El Último Tour Del Mundo is primarily a Latin trap and reggaeton album, infused with a variety of rock music styles, namely alternative rock, indie rock, pop rock, acoustic rock, punk rock, post-punk, pop-punk, heavy metal, grunge, rock en español, and rock and roll, as well as influences from alternative pop, synth-pop, new wave, synthwave, electronic, reggae, lo-fi, shoegaze, house, ballad, psychedelia, soul, holiday, latin, pop, hip-hop, and R&B.

El Último Tour Del Mundo has been regarded as Bad Bunny's "most personal and creatively ambitious work yet". An "experimental, futuristic and edgy" body of work, the album marks a departure from Bad Bunny's perreo style, as it is a "more introspective, sometimes acoustic fare" and contains only two collaborations: one with R&B artist Abra and the other with Rosalía ("La Noche de Anoche"). Both songs were recorded separately, due to the COVID-19 pandemic. Regarding the lack of guest appearances, Bad Bunny stated: "I thought it was time to demonstrate the versatility and bring something fresh to the fans". He called the album "completely different from YHLQMDLG. This is a more sentimental album, more chill, the kind of thing you can listen to in your room"; he considered how people were unable to go out or party during the COVID-19 pandemic. He described the album as "rock 'n' roll, a lot of guitars–there's one song that only has guitar–it's more musical, has more fusions, and also reggaetón and rap". The album was conceived entirely during the 2020 quarantine. Bad Bunny worked on the album while traveling, in Los Angeles, Mexico, and at his home in Puerto Rico. The album was engineered by Bad Bunny's  frequent engineer  La Paciencia.

Critical reception 

At Metacritic, which assigns a normalised rating out of 100 to reviews from mainstream critics, the album has an average score of 83 based on four reviews, indicating "universal acclaim".

Thom Jurek of AllMusic named the album Bad Bunny's "most adventurous outing" which may take longtime fans "a few listens to fully grasp" but it will ultimately "leave its infectious hooks, earworms, and strangeness fully embedded." Writing for Remezcla, Diego Urdaneta noticed that Bad Bunny is "more interested in his artistic legacy than predictability", which the writer considers is "a blueprint for many artists to follow in order to break the barriers of mainstream Latin music and dare to innovate within reggaetón and trap," as the artist  mostly did not feature songs that can be categorized as club appealing. Matthew Ismael Ruiz of Pitchfork commented that El Último Tour Del Mundo "gets at the core of what makes Bad Bunny so appealing", presenting a wide range of influences with a genuine connection to his music and persona, while he also "toes the line" between rap braggadocio and "vulnerable everyman" with "relative ease." Ruiz argued that it is not Bad Bunny's best release, but "that's almost beside the point." Julyssa Lopez of Rolling Stone deemed the album "a defiant industry game-changer lit up by streaks of rock guitar," and "an eccentric good time" that "isn't by any means a repudiation of the genres that have made Bad Bunny a star; if anything, it's proof of how far they can stretch,"

Verónica Bastardo of The Quietus noticed that Bad Bunny decided to put "the dembow rhythms and party vibes aside" to experiment with "the fuzzed-up guitars and iconoclasm of punk rock" creating "fresh sound narratives" in a rather "monotone" reggaeton music scene. Gary Suarez of Vulture.com described the album as "polarizing by design" that "reflects the exciting uncertainty of the future", and considered that his three solo studio albums "showcase the Bunny we know—sensitive yet cocksure, playful yet determined." He further compared the "universally adored" YHLQMDLG to the "individualistic, left of center" El Último Tour Del Mundo.

Awards and nominations

Commercial performance 
El Último Tour Del Mundo debuted at number one on the US Billboard 200 with 116,000  becoming the first all-Spanish-language album to top the chart. It earned Bad Bunny his fourth top 10 entry. Before El Último Tour Del Mundo, only two mostly Spanish-sung albums reached number one on the chart, Selena's Dreaming of You (1995) and Il Divo's Ancora (2006). It also became the fourth all-Spanish language album to enter the top five, the others being Shakira's Fijación Oral, Vol. 1 (2005) and Maná's Amar es Combatir (2006), both at number four, and his album YHLQMDLG (2020) at number two. In its second week, the album dropped to number two on the chart, earning an additional 57,000 units. It was the 4th Best Selling Latin Album of 2020 in the United States with 348,000 units. It was the Best Selling Latin Album in the United States of 2021 with 854,000 units. As of January 2023, El Último Tour del Mundo had sold 1.7 million equivalent units in the United States.

In Argentina, El Ultimo Tour del Mundo was the most streamed album on Spotify. In Chile, El Ultimo Tour Mundo was the most consumed album and Bad Bunny the most listened international artist on Spotify. In Mexico and Colombia, "El Ultimo Tour Del Mundo" was the most listened album on Spotify and "Dakiti" the most cosumed song.

The fifteen track, 'Antes Que Se Acabe' samples astrologer's, Walter Mercado famous tagline.

In Spain, it was the third most streamed album of 2021.

Commentary 
In an article for Billboard, Leila Cobo considered the number-one position "a huge win" for the Latin music industry, that "for decades has seen its artists systematically undermined by the mainstream media, and by the industry overall, unless they either sing in English or collaborate with a mainstream act who does." Among the factors that made that possible, she cited Bad Bunny being "arguably one of the most popular artists globally", the era of streaming, the Latin music genre's sustained growth both in the US and globally, and that he was not "subjected" to the barriers to entry that Latin artists "have had to crash into for years" in the US, as they did not enjoy the same distribution, radio airplay, media coverage or presence, award show nominations or appearances as mainstream acts, "even when their global music sales merited it." She also deemed him "a unique artist with a unique appeal that's not easily replicated." Ben Sisario of The New York Times also cited streaming as "key" for his success.

Track listing

Additional notes 
  signifies an uncredited co-producer

Credits and personnel

Musicians 

 Bad Bunny – main artist
 Rosalía – vocals 
 Jhay Cortez – vocals 
 Abra – vocals 
 Trio Vegabajeño – vocals

Production 

 MAG – production 
 Caleb Calloway – production 
 Mora – production 
 Mick Coogan – production 
 Mr. NaisGai – production 
 Elikai – production 
 Hazen – production 
 Súbelo Neo – production 
 Chris Jedi – production 
 Gaby Music – production 
 Tainy – production  
 Misael de la Cruz – production 
 La Paciencia – production 
 Bass Charity – production 
 Lara Project – production 
 Trio Vegabajeño – production

Technical 

 Colin Leonard – mastering 
 Josh Gudwin – mixing

Charts

Weekly charts

Year-end charts

Certifications

References 

2020 albums
Bad Bunny albums
Albums produced by Tainy
Reggaeton albums
Latin trap albums
Alternative rock albums by Puerto Rican artists
Latin Grammy Award for Best Urban Music Album